Louis "Lou" Lukanovich (born December 5, 1930) is a Croatian-born, Canadian sprint canoer who competed in the early 1960s. He and partner Alan McCleery were eliminated in the repechage round of the K-2 1000 m event at the 1960 Summer Olympics in Rome.

After his Olympic career, the Zagreb-born Lukanovich went on to a lifetime of involvement in the sport of canoe-kayak. He was a coach for the Canadian team at the Olympic Games in 1972 in Munich and 1976 in Montreal. He is currently the president and chief designer at Simon River Sports, a Quebec-based manufacturer and supplier of canoe-kayak and other sporting equipment. Lukanovich co-founded the Viking Canoe Club in 2001. In 2014 Lukanovich was awarded the Edgar R. Gilbert award by CanoeKayak Canada for his sustained contribution to coaching in the sport.

References

1930 births
Living people
Sportspeople from Zagreb
Croatian emigrants to Canada
Yugoslav emigrants to Canada
Canadian male canoeists
Canoeists at the 1960 Summer Olympics
Olympic canoeists of Canada